Tom Petty was a rock artist who released 10 studio albums as Tom Petty and the Heartbreakers, three solo albums, two albums with Mudcrutch, and two albums as part of the supergroup The Traveling Wilburys.

American Music Awards
The American Music Awards are awarded annually by votes of music buyers and the general public. Petty received one nomination, in 1990.

|-
|1990||Traveling Wilburys Vol. 1||Favourite Pop/Rock New Artist||

Billboard Music Awards
The Billboard Music Awards are sponsored by Billboard magazine and is held annually in December. Tom Petty won one award.

|-
|align="center"| 2005 || Tom Petty || Billboard Century Award ||

Grammy Awards
The Grammy Awards are awarded annually by the National Academy of Recording Arts and Sciences of the United States. Tom Petty has received three awards from 18 nominations. MusiCares honored Tom Petty as MusiCares Person of the Year in 2017.

MTV Video Music Awards

The MTV Video Music Awards is an annual awards ceremony established in 1984 by MTV.

Radio Music Awards

The Radio Music Awards are an annual award show that honors the year's most successful songs on mainstream radio.

References

Petty, Tom
Awards